AVH  may refer to:
Alex Van Halen, drummer of hard rock band Van Halen
Alexander von Humboldt
Antelope Valley Hospital, a hospital in Lancaster, California
AVH: Alien vs Hunter, a low budget science fiction film by The Asylum
A.V.H., a song by Ozzy Osbourne from the album No More Tears
 Armand Van Helden, a DJ
State Protection Authority, the Hungarian Secret Police (Államvédelmi Hatóság)
The Aviation Herald, an aviation incident and accident news reporting site.
 AVH: Australasian Virtual Herbarium, an online database containing records of more than 5 million plant specimens kept in some Australian & New Zealand herbaria